The 1923 South Australian Football League season was the 44th season of the top-level Australian rules football competition in South Australia.

Ladder

Finals series

Grand Final

References 

SAFL
South Australian National Football League seasons